Sand Point Airport  is a state owned, public use airport located two nautical miles (4 km) southwest of the central business district of Sand Point, a city in the Aleutians East Borough in the U.S. state of Alaska. Scheduled airline service to Anchorage International Airport is provided by Peninsula Airways (PenAir).

As per the Federal Aviation Administration, this airport had 4,296 passenger boardings (enplanements) in calendar year 2008, 3,957 in 2009, and 4,281 in 2010. The National Plan of Integrated Airport Systems for 2011–2015 categorized it as a non-primary commercial service airport.

Facilities and aircraft 
Sand Point Airport resides at elevation of 21 feet (6 m) above mean sea level. It has one runway designated 13/31 with an asphalt surface measuring 5,213 by 150 feet (1,589 x 46 m). For the 12-month period ending December 16, 2003, the airport had 2,012 aircraft operations, an average of 167 per month: 59.6% general aviation, 32.6% air taxi, and 7.8% scheduled commercial.

Airlines and destinations

Statistics

References

External links 
 FAA Alaska airport diagram (GIF)
 Topographic map from USGS The National Map
 

Airports in Aleutians East Borough, Alaska